Frank J. "Cepi" Cepollina (born December 6, 1936 in Castro Valley, California is an American engineer and inventor.  He was officially inducted to the National Inventors Hall of Fame for his pioneering concept of in-orbit satellite servicing in May 2003. His organizational leadership style has been compared to that of Al Davis of the National Football League's Oakland Raiders.

Hobby
Out of work, he models O gauge railroads. "I've found great satisfaction in this hobby for more than 40 years," he says. "And it's a nice escape from the daily grind."

Cepollina as an inventor
Cepollina himself has noted that "the experiences of NASA's first space walkers pioneered a lot of the technologies we use today," for example a change in space-suit design. The Gemini 9 astronauts wore suits inflated to 14 pounds per square inch, that being normal pressure on earth. NASA cut the level to 4 PSI, reducing the feeling of working inside an overinflated balloon. Furthermore, a new training was developed for moving about in space: practice sessions underwater since moving in a liquid resembles the effects of weightlessness.

In his article "In-Orbit Servicing", Cepollina states that in the late 1960s, as inflation and constrained budgets limited the space program, NASA determined three ways of reducing costs: standardized spacecraft components; use of the same spacecraft to do several missions; and use of the Shuttle to extend or renew the useful life of the spacecraft by replacing subsystems and instruments in the orbit.

Earth Observing System (EOS), which is a program of NASA comprising a series of artificial satellite missions and scientific instruments in Earth orbit, asked Grumman Aerospace, General Electric and TRW Systems to define the most cost effective mode for using the space shuttle. The companies identified four different methods of “renewing” the defective spacecraft:

Solar Maximum Mission satellite
The first modular craft to fly was the Solar Maximum Mission satellite, launched in 1980 to conduct astronomical observations of the sun. When it began to fail several months into orbit, Cepollina was asked to lead the repair mission, begun in 1984. The mission was successful, and the modular-craft concept proved effective. Cepollina was subsequently named Satellite Servicing Project Manager.

Hubble Space Telescope
After the Solar Maximum Mission Satellite, as the Satellite Servicing Project Manager, Cepollina was tasked with repairing the Hubble Space Telescope. Having worked on the development of its modular design, as well as its command and control subsystem, Cepollina knew the Hubble's systems well, and the issue was later identified as- 375 miles above Earth- a flawed mirror. NASA discovered that this had been caused by a miscalculation which made the telescope incapable of focussing sharply.

Cepollina led other repair and improvement missions for Hubble in 1997, 1999, 2002, and 2009. These added newer technologies such as improved cameras, solar arrays, and improved processors.

Inventions applied in other fields
His work has led to developments in other industries, including a method of detecting breast cancer, as well as more powerful microchips that used Hubble-type optics and manufacturing applications employing an intelligent, programmable, hand-held power tool.

Awards

In 2003, he was inducted to the National Inventor's Hall of Fame for satellite servicing techniques.

References

20th-century American inventors
Engineers from California
Living people
1936 births
People from Castro Valley, California